Esben Storm (26 May 1950 – 28 March 2011) was a Danish Australian actor, screenwriter, television producer, television director, voice artist and songwriter.

He was well known for his work with the Australian Children's Television Foundation, headed by Patricia Edgar, where he worked for 15 years. The company sold programs to 92 countries, and Storm was involved in writing, acting, editing, and directing numerous programs, including  Round the Twist. He worked to adapt John Marsden's Tomorrow series but lost the rights to the film.

His acting credits included roles in the films The Coca-Cola Kid (1985), Wrong World (1985) and Young Einstein (1988); his last acting role was in the medical drama series All Saints.

Biography
Storm came to Australia with parents Laurits and Ane in 1958 after Laurits lost the family farm to lawyers. After having settled in Melbourne, his father worked as a builder's labourer and built a darkroom where Esben learned photographic processing, composition and lighting.

Storm started making films at 18 with his partner Haydn Keenan.  His early work was mostly serious in nature, including a 1983 documentary about the Hilton Bombing in Sydney called With Prejudice. He wrote and directed 27A (1974), In Search of Anna (1978) (with film stills and publicity shots by Carol Jerrems, who was then his girlfriend), Deadly (1991), and Subterano (2003); he directed Devil's Hill (1988) and the Tasmanian film in the Touch the Sun series of bicentennial telemovies. In 2007, he directed the SBS comedy series Kick.

Storm also worked on several television series such as Round the Twist, The Genie from Down Under (in which he was scriptwriter and director), Sky Trackers (in which he was script consultant), Li'l Elvis Jones and the Truckstoppers (in which he was the show's creator, scriptwriter and dialogue director), Blue Heelers (as a director), Crash Zone, and Winners (for which he directed the episode "The Other Facts of Life").

Actor 
In 1976, Storm acted in Hanging About, a film by Carol Jerrems, who was then his girlfriend and living with him in Willoughby. He played Tom in Room to Move and Leo George in The Other Facts of Life, and also appeared in More Winners (in which he played The Waiter in the episode "The Big Wish") and Phoenix (in which he played Pat). In Blue Heelers (which he also directed), he played Colin Roper in the episode "Breaking the Cycle".

Death 
Storm died, aged 60, on 28 March 2011.

Select filmography
Doors (1969) – short
In His Prime (1972) – short
Stephanie (1972) – short
A Motion Picture (1972) – short
27A (1974)
In Search of Anna (1978)
With Prejudice (1982)
"Birthin' Hips" (1983)
Stanley (1984)
Round the Twist (1989–2001) – director and script consultant (1989), writer/screenplay (1991; 2000–01), actor (as Mr. Snapper)
Deadly (1991)
"Terrormisu: A Night Of Just Desserts " (1993)
"Rusty & The Bathtub Banana" (1993)
Li'l Elvis and the Truckstoppers (1998)

Unmade films
Angel Gear (mid-1970s)
Bondi Blue (early 1980s) – Reg Grundy withdrew financing just before filming was to start
Dirty Barry (written 1970s, tried to make 1980s)
 " Doctor Flatus" (1994)

Awards
1979: Australian Film Institute Award for Best Original Screenplay (In Search of Anna)

References

External links

Storm Productions

1950 births
2011 deaths
Australian male television actors
Australian male film actors
Australian screenwriters
Australian television producers
Australian television directors
Australian television writers
Australian voice directors
Australian people of Danish descent
Danish emigrants to Australia
Australian male television writers